Suzan Lamens (born 5 July 1999) is a Dutch professional tennis player. Lamens has a best singles ranking by the Women's Tennis Association (WTA) of 161, achieved on 18 July 2022. She also has a career-high WTA doubles ranking of 206, attained on 26 July 2021.

Career
Lamens won her first $60k title at the 2021 Amstelveen Open, in the doubles draw, partnering Quirine Lemoine.

She made her WTA Tour debut at the 2022 Copa Colsanitas.

Grand Slam performance

Singles

ITF finals

Singles: 9 (4 titles, 5 runner-ups)

Doubles: 27 (15 titles, 12 runner-ups)

Notes

References

External links
 
 

1999 births
Living people
Dutch female tennis players
20th-century Dutch women
21st-century Dutch women